Argyresthia franciscella is a moth of the family Yponomeutidae. It is found in North America, including California.

There is one generation per year.

The larvae feed on Cupressus species, including Cupressus macrocarpa. They mine growing tips of their host plant. Pupation takes place within the killed plant's tip.

References

Moths described in 1915
Argyresthia
Moths of North America